Stef Pinto is a Canadian independent video game developer. His self-published works, including Exit Mask and Cookies, are surrealistic and experimental horror games. Outside of his independent games, Pinto works with the Minneapolis-based video game studio WALLRIDE on commercial projects.

Career 

Pinto's games are experimental games with common reference points in popular culture and taboo subject matter, often incorporating "eclectic and sometimes underground sources of information and inspiration" in his design approach. He has stated that his development process is open-ended and he prefers to "give little importance to cohesion...or other conventions". The rhythm is disjointed, the geometry of the levels is raw, (and) the visual effects are sensory overload.

Exit Mask, released in September 2019, was Pinto's first official independent release. Pinto stated the game was influenced by his diagnosis of obsessive-compulsive disorder, stating that he was inspired to turn his experiences with intrusive thoughts into a game, allowing him to "share feelings I couldn't verbalize (by) subjecting players to both visual and auditory sensory onslaught." He cited the games Vib Ribbon and Coil and the Death Grips album Government Plates as creative references for the visual and sound design of the game. Alpha Beta Gamer described the game as "easily one of the most intense and unsettling psychological horror experiences around", praising its "oppressive black and white visuals" and "unnerving soundtrack (and) imagery."

Cookies was released by Pinto in April 2021. Described as a "PSX-coated blend of Satanic cults, meth-dealing clowns and online torture chambers", Pinto stated that the game was an attempt to "forego any direct form of story development" through non-linear gameplay, with the game's subject matter inspired by the video game Manhunt, the film Trash Humpers, and "VHS horror films, the Satanic Panic of the 1980s and bizarre tales of murderers like the Son of Sam." The game was released in collaboration with Pequin Games with music by Johar Ibrahim.

Cookies received praise from several websites. Alexis Ong of The Indie Game Website praised the game as "charming" and "equal parts terrifying and delicious", stating "each room, each scene is visually pitch-perfect for Pinto's darkly funny vision." Ryan Aston of Slant praised Cookies as one of the best games of the year, praising the game's "PSX aesthetic", "unique open world" and "sensation of paranoia and nausea." Jans Holstrom of Dread XP praised the game's "open-ended style of exploration", stating the game is "insane" and "excels in making you uncomfortable." Steven Nguyen Scaife of Fanbyte praised the game as "grungy and unpleasant and darkly - sometimes very darkly - funny," calling the game the "feel-like-absolute-garbage experience of the year".

In January 2022, Pinto lead the art direction of Tzimtzum, a "surreal retro-styled horror game inspired by P.T., cosmology and Jewish mysticism" and the works of Zdzisław Beksiński and David Cronenberg that was developed as a "collaboration between several college friends", namely programmer and designer Vivian Rousseau and programmers Darien Caron and Remi Teeple. In December 2022, Pinto released Haram, a "blasphemous" game described as a short narrative walking simulator inspired by the photography of Andres Serrano."

Personal life 

Pinto studied an Advanced Diploma in Game Development at the Ontario Algonquin College of Applied Arts and Technology from 2016 to 2019. From 2022, Pinto has worked with the Minneapolis-based video game studio WALLRIDE as a junior engineer, contributing to games including Gravity Sucks!

Games

References

Canadian video game designers
Indie video game developers
Living people
Video game writers
Year of birth missing (living people)